A special election was held in  on January 11, 1795 to fill a vacancy in the Third Congress left by the death of Abraham Clark (P) on September 15, 1794.

Election results 

Kitchell took his seat in the Congress on January 29, 1795

See also 
List of special elections to the United States House of Representatives

References 

New Jersey at-large
New Jersey 1795 at-large
1795
New Jersey at-large
1795 New Jersey elections
United States House of Representatives 1795 at-large